Attila Szabados (born 7 August 1973) is a retired Serbian-Hungarian footballer, who played in the Yugoslav First League (1989–93, 1994–95) and Hungarian First League (1993–94).

Career
He started playing in FK Palić where his talent was spotted by Yugoslav First League club Spartak Subotica. He played there from 1989 until 1993 when he moved to Hungary to continue his career playing for Békéscsaba Előre, MTK Budapest, Diósgyőri VTK, Vasas SC, Pécsi Mecsek FC and Paksi SE. He played as a forward. In the 1994/95 season he played with FK Bačka 1901 in the Second League of FR Yugoslavia Group North.

Personal life
Szabados was born in Subotica, SR Serbia, SFR Yugoslavia, and is of ethnic Hungarian descent.

References

External links
 Early career in players list at fcobilic.tripod.com

Living people
1973 births
Sportspeople from Subotica
Hungarians in Vojvodina
Hungarian footballers
FK Spartak Subotica players
FK Palić players
Békéscsaba 1912 Előre footballers
MTK Budapest FC players
Diósgyőri VTK players
Vasas SC players
Pécsi MFC players
Paksi FC players
FK Bačka 1901 players
Association football forwards
Serbian expatriate sportspeople in Hungary